Kathleen Foster may refer to:

Kathy Foster (musician)
Kathleen Foster Campbell, née Kathleen Foster

See also
Kathy Foster (disambiguation)
Katherine Foster (disambiguation)